Kevin Michael Croom (born July 15, 1987) is an American mixed martial artist currently competing in the Lightweight division. A professional since 2009, he has fought in the UFC, Bellator, Titan FC, the RFA, the LFA, and CES MMA.

Mixed martial arts career

Early career
Croom has fought for multiple MMA promotions during his professional MMA career, including Legacy Fighting Alliance and Bellator MMA. Croom has 16 stoppages in his total of 21 professional victories.

Croom faced Brian Davidson at Bellator 26 on August 26, 2010. Davidson lost via rear-naked choke submission in the second round.
 
In his seventh fight, Croom faced Justin Gaethje in his professional debut on August 20, 2011. Gaethje won the fight in the first round via KO due to a slam after Croom attempted a submission.

Croom faced Bryan Goldsby at Titan FC 27 on February 28, 2014. He won by unanimous decision.

Croom fought for the CES MMA Featherweight Championship against reigning champion Matt Bessette at  CES MMA 41, losing via TKO.

Croom defeated Darrick Minner via TKO in the second round at LFA 48.

Croom faced John Teixeira at Bellator 218 on March 22, 2019. He lost the fight via unanimous decision.

Croom tapped out Charles Bennett via rear-naked choke in round one at FAC 1 to pick up submission victory number 10 as a professional.

At Bellator 239, Croom took on Adil Benijilany and defeated him via split decision.

In the fight before getting a UFC contract, Croom faced Anderson Hutchinson, who was later in September arrested for having sex with a 17-year-old female boxing student, on August 14, 2020, at Fighting Alliance Championship 3 for the FAC Featherweight Championship. Croom won the championship fight via unanimous decision.

Ultimate Fighting Championship
Croom, replacing Giga Chikadze as a COVID replacement, was scheduled to face Alex Caceres on August 29, 2020, at UFC Fight Night: Smith vs. Rakić The following day, Croom was removed after also testing positive for COVID and replaced by fellow newcomer Austin Springer.

Croom made his UFC debut, as an injury fill in for Matt Frevola, against Roosevelt Roberts on September 12, 2020, at UFC Fight Night: Waterson vs. Hill. Croom won the fight via a guillotine choke in round one. This fight earned him the Performance of the Night award. After the fight, Croom said on Twitter that he had only $64 in his bank account before the fight.

On November 4, it was announced by the Nevada State Athletic Commission (NSAC) that the fight with Roosevelt Roberts would be overturned to a no contest, after Croom tested positive for marijuana. Croom was suspended for 4 1⁄2 months and had to pay a fine of $1,800.

Croom faced Alex Caceres on February 27, 2021, at UFC Fight Night: Rozenstruik vs. Gane. He lost the bout via unanimous decision.

Croom was scheduled to face Marcelo Rojo on August 28, 2021, at UFC on ESPN 30. However, Croom was removed from the bout in mid-August for undisclosed reasons.

Croom faced Brian Kelleher, replacing Saidyokub Kakhramonov, on January 15, 2022, at UFC on ESPN 32. He lost the fight via unanimous decision.

Croom faced Alateng Heili at UFC on ESPN 34 on April 16, 2022. He lost the fight via TKO early into the first round.

In May 2022, it was reported that Croom was released from UFC.

Post UFC 
In his first bout after his UFC release, Croom faced Brad Robinson on September 10, 2022 at Synergy FC: Kansas City Fight Night. He won the bout via majority decision.

Championships and achievements

Mixed martial arts
 Ultimate Fighting Championship
Performance of the Night (One time) 
Fighting Alliance Championship 
 FAC Featherweight Championship (One Time)
Shamrock Fighting Championships 
  SFC Bantamweight Championship (One Time)

Mixed martial arts record

|-
|Win
|align=center|22–15 (1)
|Brad Robison
|Decision (majority)
|Synergy FC: Kansas City Fight Night
|
|align=center|3
|align=center|5:00
|Kansas City, Kansas, United States
|
|-
|Loss
|align=center|21–15 (1)
|Alateng Heili
|TKO (punches)
|UFC on ESPN: Luque vs. Muhammad 2
|
|align=center|1
|align=center|0:47
|Las Vegas, Nevada, United States
|
|-
|Loss
|align=center|21–14 (1)
|Brian Kelleher
|Decision (unanimous)
|UFC on ESPN: Kattar vs. Chikadze
|
|align=center|3
|align=center|5:00
|Las Vegas, Nevada, United States
|
|-
| Loss
| align=center| 21–13 (1)
| Alex Caceres
| Decision (unanimous)
| UFC Fight Night: Rozenstruik vs. Gane
| 
| align=center|3
| align=center| 5:00
| Las Vegas, Nevada, United States
| 
|-
|NC
| align=center| 21–12 (1)
| Roosevelt Roberts
|NC (overturned)
|UFC Fight Night: Waterson vs. Hill
|
|align=center|1
|align=center|0:31
|Las Vegas, Nevada, United States
|
|-
| Win
| align=center| 21–12
|Anderson Hutchinson
| Decision (unanimous)
| Fighting Alliance Championship 3
| 
| align=center|5
| align=center| 5:00
| Independence, Missouri, United States
|
|-
| Win
| align=center|20–12
|Adil Benjilany
| Decision (split)
|Bellator 239
|
|align=center|3
|align=center|5:00
|Thackerville, Oklahoma, United States
|
|-
| Win
| align=center| 19–12
| Charles Bennett
|Submission (rear-naked choke) 
| Fighting Alliance Championship 1
| 
| align=center| 1
| align=center| 2:15 
| Independence, Missouri, United States
|
|-
| Loss
| align=center| 18–12
| John Macapá
| Decision (unanimous)
| Bellator 218
| 
| align=center| 3
| align=center| 5:00
| Thackerville, Oklahoma, United States
|
|-
| Loss
| align=center|18–11
| Kamuela Kirk
|Submission (triangle choke)
|LFA 53
|
|align=center|1
|align=center|3:54
|Phoenix, Arizona, United States
|
|-
| Win
| align=center| 18–10
| Darrick Minner
| TKO (elbows)
|LFA 48
|
| align=center|2
| align=center|2:10
|Kearney, Nebraska, United States
|
|-
| Loss
| align=center|17–10
| Nate Jennerman
| Technical Submission (guillotine choke)
|LFA 41
|
|align=center|1
|align=center|0:48
|Prior Lake, Minnesota, United States
| 
|-
| Win
| align=center| 17–9
| CJay Hunter
| Submission (rear-naked choke)
| KC Fighting Alliance 27
| 
| align=center| 3
| align=center| 1:16
| Independence, Missouri, United States
| 
|-
| Loss
| align=center|16–9
| Matt Bessette
| TKO (punches and kicks)
| CES 41: Bessette vs. Croom
|
|align=center|3
|align=center|0:32
|Lincoln, Rhode Island, United States
|
|-
| Loss
| align=center|16–8
| Tatsuya Ando
| Technical Submission (rear-naked choke)
|Shooto Pacific Rim Double Championship
| 
| align=center| 2
| align=center| 3:13
| Tokyo, Japan
| 
|-
| Win
| align=center|16–7
| Lenny Wheeler
| TKO (punches)
| Triumph FC 1
| 
| align=center| 1
| align=center| 0:26
| Edmonton, Alberta, Canada
|
|-
| Loss
| align=center|15–7
| Rasul Mirzaev
| TKO (punches)
| Fight Nights Global 41: Dagestan
|
|align=center|2
|align=center|3:16
|Kaspiysk, Russia
|
|-
| Win
| align=center|15–6
| Jacob Akin
|KO (punch)
|Shamrock FC: Shock
|
|align=center|1
|align=center|2:13
|Kansas City, Missouri, United States
|
|-
| Loss
| align=center|14–6
| Jesse Brock
|Decision (split)
|MFC 40
|
|align=center|3
|align=center|5:00
|Edmonton, Alberta, Canada
|
|-
| Win
| align=center|14–5
| Bryan Goldsby
| Decision (unanimous)
| Titan FC 27
| 
| align=center| 3
| align=center| 5:00
| Kansas City, Kansas, United States
|
|-
| Win
| align=center| 13–5
| Aslan Toktarbaev
| TKO (corner stoppage)
| Alash Pride: Great Battle 2
| 
|align=Center|1
|align=center|2:55
| Almaty, Kazakhstan
| 
|-
| Win
| align=center| 12–5
| Deryck Ripley
| Submission (rear-naked choke)
| Cage Time Production
|
|align=Center|1
|align=center|3:23
|Columbia, Missouri, United States
| 
|-
| Win
| align=center| 11–5
| Dustin Phillips
| Submission (rear-naked choke)
| Titan FC 26
| 
| align=center| 1
| align=center| 1:45
| Kansas City, Missouri, United States
| 
|-
| Win
| align=center| 10–5
| Javier Lujan
| TKO (retirement)
| World MMA Council: Mexican Standoff
| 
| align=center| 1
| align=center| 3:30
| Ciudad Juárez, Mexico
| 
|-
| Win
| align=center| 9–5
| Adam Rider
| Submission (rear-naked choke)
| Cage Time Production
| 
| align=center| 1
| align=center| 1:16
| Columbia, Missouri, United States
| 
|-
| Win
| align=center| 8–5
| Brian Pearman
| Submission (rear-naked choke)
| Tommy Tran Promotions
| 
| align=center| 1
| align=center| 3:03
| Springfield, Missouri, United States
|
|-
| Win
| align=center| 7–5
| Brian Davidson
| TKO (punches)
| RFA 6: Krause vs. Imada 2
| 
| align=center| 1
| align=center| 0:42
| Kansas City, Missouri, United States
|
|-
| Win
| align=center|6–5
| Nate Murdock
| Decision (unanimous)
| Tommy Tran Promotions
| 
| align=center|3
| align=center|5:00
| Branson, Missouri, United States
|
|-
| Loss
| align=center| 5–5
| Yaotzin Meza
|Decision (unanimous)
| Rage in the Cage 163
|
|align=center| 3
|align=center| 5:00
|Chandler, Arizona, United States
|
|-
| Loss
| align=center| 5–4
| Ramiro Hernandez
|Decision (split)
|Titan FC 21
|
|align=center|3
|align=center|5:00
|Kansas City, Kansas, United States
|
|-
| Win
| align=center|5–3
| Rodrigo Sotelo
|Decision (unanimous)
| Sun City Battle 2
| 
| align=center|3
| align=center|3:00
| El Paso, Texas, United States
|
|-
| Loss
| align=center| 4–3
| Justin Gaethje
| KO (slam)
| ROF 41: Bragging Rights
| 
| align=center| 1
| align=center| 1:01
| Broomfield, Colorado, United States
| 
|-
| Win
| align=center| 4–2
| J.R. Sotelo
| Submission (triangle choke)
| Sun City Battle 1
|
|align=Center|1
|align=center|0:16
|El Paso, Texas, United States
| 
|-
| Win
| align=center| 3–2
| Brian Davidson
|  Submission (rear-naked choke) 
| Bellator 26
| 
| align=center| 2
| align=center| 3:22
| Kansas City, Missouri, United States
| 
|-
| Win
| align=center| 2–2
| Kody Frank
| Submission (triangle choke)
| Friday Night Fight Night
| 
| align=center| 2
| align=center| 4:05
| Sedalia, Missouri, United States
| 
|-
| Win
| align=center| 1–2
| Eddie Granado
| Submission (rear-naked choke) 
|Midwest Fight League
| 
| align=center| 1
| align=center| 4:52
| Boonville, Missouri, United States
| 
|-
| Loss
| align=center| 0–2
| Willie Mack
| KO (punch)
| Warfare Xtreme Cagefighting: Caged Controversy
| 
| align=center| 1
| align=center| 0:37
| Sedalia, Missouri, United States
|
|-
| Loss
| align=center| 0–1
| Jose Vega
|Submission
| Hulett Productions: First Blood
| 
| align=center| 2
| align=center| 2:22
| Sedalia, Missouri, United States
|

Bare knuckle boxing record

|-
|Win
|align=center|2–0 
|Chevvy Bridges	
|KO (punches)
|BKFC KnuckleMania 3
|
|align=center|1
|align=center|1:11
|Albuquerque, New Mexico, United States
|
|-
|Win
|align=center|1–0
|Sean Wilson	
|KO (punch)
|BKFC 33
|
|align=center|2
|align=center|1:36
|Omaha, Nebraska, United States
|

See also 
 List of male mixed martial artists

References

External links 
  
 

Living people
Lightweight mixed martial artists
1987 births
American male mixed martial artists
Mixed martial artists utilizing Brazilian jiu-jitsu
Ultimate Fighting Championship male fighters
American practitioners of Brazilian jiu-jitsu
People from Columbia, Missouri